Vitaly Mikhaylovich Zhironkin (born 10 March 2000) is a Russian football player who plays for Tekstilshchik Ivanovo.

Club career
On 1 July 2019, Zhironkin joined FC Baltika Kaliningrad on loan for the 2019–20 season. Zhironkin made his debut in the Russian Football National League for FC Baltika Kaliningrad on 13 July 2019 in a game against FC Torpedo Moscow.

On 20 July 2020, CSKA announced that Zhironkin had returned to Baltika Kaliningrad on loan for the 2020–21 season. On 13 January 2021, the loan was terminated early.

On 1 February 2021, he joined KAMAZ Naberezhnye Chelny on loan until the end of the 2020–21 season.

On 2 July 2021, he was loaned to FC Volgar Astrakhan for the 2021–22 season. On 27 January 2022, the loan was terminated early and he moved to Kairat Moscow on a new loan.

On 11 July 2022, Zhirnokin moved to Tekstilshchik Ivanovo on a permanent basis.

References

External links
 Profile by Russian Football National League
 
 

2000 births
People from Balakovo
Living people
Russian footballers
Russia youth international footballers
Association football midfielders
Association football forwards
PFC CSKA Moscow players
FC Baltika Kaliningrad players
FC KAMAZ Naberezhnye Chelny players
FC Volgar Astrakhan players
FC Tekstilshchik Ivanovo players
Russian First League players
Russian Second League players
Sportspeople from Saratov Oblast